The 2010 Campeonato de Primeira Divisão de Futebol Profissional da FGF (2010 FGF First Division Professional Football Championship), better known as the 2010 Campeonato Gaúcho or  Gaúcho, was the 90th edition of the top flight football league of the Brazilian state of Rio Grande do Sul. The season began on 16 January and ended on 2 May, when Grêmio, despite losing the final match to their city rivals Internacional 0-1, clinched their 36th title in history thanks to their 2-0 win in the first match. The win broke a 2-year streak by Internacional. Other clubs like São José, Novo Hamburgo and Pelotas also caught the attention due to their overall record in the competition. All three clubs qualified to the 2010 Campeonato Brasileiro Série D.

Format
The sixteen clubs were divided into two groups that would contest in only two matches to determine which four teams from each group would qualify to the play-offs. The first stage called Taça Piratini 2012 (Piratini Cup 2012, won by Caxias) had each team from one group play only one club in the other group. In the second stage, called Taça Farroupilha 2012 (Farroupilha Cup 2012, won by Grêmio) each club within each group played one match against a club in the group. The two lowest ranked teams in the overall standings were relegated (Internacional (SM) and Porto Alegre.

Teams
Porto Alegre and Pelotas — winner and runner-up of the 2009 Campeonato Gaúcho Segunda Divisão, respectively — took the places from Brasil and Sapucaiense, relegated in the last tournament.

1The club played the 2009 season under the name S.C. Ulbra.

Groups

Group 1: Grêmio, Juventude, Avenida, Esportivo, Internacional (SM), Porto Alegre and Ypiranga.

Group 2: Internacional, Caxias, Pelotas, Santa Cruz, São José and São Luiz, Universidade and Veranópolis.

Results

Taça Fernando Carvalho

First stage

Group A standings

Group B standings

Results

Playoffs

Final

Taça Fábio Koff

First stage

Group A standings

Group A results

Group B standings

Group B results

Playoffs bracket

* Homeground advantage

Final

Tournament Finals

Grêmio won 2–1 on aggregate.

Overall table
The overall table considers only the matches played during the first stage of both Taça Fernando Carvalho and Taça Fábio Koff and will define the two teams that will be relegated to play lower levels in 2011. Moreover, the best and second-best placed teams not playing Campeonato Brasileiro Série A (Grêmio, Internacional), B or C (Caxias, Juventude) will be "promoted" to 2010 Campeonato Brasileiro Série D.

References

Campeonato Gaúcho seasons
Gaucho